Darius Brown may refer to:
 Darius A. Brown (1869–1938), former mayor of Kansas City, Missouri
 Darius J. Brown, Delaware legislator